Cham-e Vazir (also Romanized as Cham-e Vazīr) is a village in Shurab Rural District, Veysian District, Dowreh County, Lorestan Province, Iran. At the 2006 census, its population was 107, in 24 families.

References 

Towns and villages in Dowreh County